Camel Creek Adventure Park is an adventure park located in Wadebridge in Cornwall, England.

History
Terry Sandling bought Trelow Farm in Tredinnick and opened the property to the public in 1989 as The Shire Horse Centre. The property was then sold to Crealy Great Adventure Parks in 2004. Following an acquisition in 2015, John Broome CBE purchased Cornwall's Crealy and rebranded it as Camel Creek Adventure Park.

Operating Attractions

Other Attractions 
Along with the attractions listed above there are a few more. Mission simpossible is a 5D theatre with moving seats, 3d glasses and other equipment. The park also offers a 3D theatre along with this. The park also has two Indoor play areas (Dina's double drop and Creeky's playhouse) as well as seasonal attractions such as a haunted house and ghost train. The park plans to open a new attraction called flume lagoon in the near future.

Future 
At the same time as purchasing the park, John Broome also purchased nearly 200 acres (81 ha) of land adjacent to it and announced his plans to turn Camel Creek Adventure park into a six-star resort, the first in the UK. The plans would have created 955 jobs in and around a holiday and leisure park with 236 holiday homes. There would of also been a convention centre and amenities such as a restaurant, pub and shops. After the council granted permission for the project in October 2016, work was planned to complete in 2022 with construction reducing season times, opening hours and ride availability of Camel Creek. However, With minimal progress being made to the project, and with the plans being scaled back, it is unknown if the project will ever be finished.

References

External links
Official Website

Amusement parks in England
Tourist attractions in Cornwall